Harald Nilsen Tangen (born 3 January 2001) is a Norwegian footballer who plays as a midfielder for Viking FK.

Career
In 2016, Nilsen Tangen signed for Viking FK. He made his league debut for the club in a 4–1 win over FK Jerv on 22 July 2018. On 29 May 2019, he was loaned out to 1. divisjon club Tromsdalen. On 26 August 2020, he was loaned out for a second time, this time to Åsane. He scored his first goal for Viking against Mjøndalen on 27 May 2021. On 5 August 2021, he signed a contract extension until the end of the 2024 season.

Career statistics

Notes

References

External links
 Profile for Viking FK

2001 births
Living people
Sportspeople from Stavanger
Norwegian footballers
Norway youth international footballers
Viking FK players
Tromsdalen UIL players
Åsane Fotball players
Norwegian Third Division players
Norwegian First Division players
Eliteserien players
Association football midfielders